On 27 March 2021, an Airbus AS350B3 helicopter crashed near the Knik Glacier, Palmer, Alaska. Five occupants died, including Czech billionaire entrepreneur Petr Kellner; one occupant survived.

Aircraft
The helicopter involved in the accident was an Airbus AS350B3, registration N351SH.

Accident

On 27 March 2021, an Airbus AS350B3 helicopter crashed near the Knik Glacier, Palmer, Alaska during a heliskiing trip in Alaska's backcountry. Five occupants died, one survived. One of the victims was Czech billionaire entrepreneur Petr Kellner.

The missing helicopter was reported to the authorities two hours after the tracking signal stopped.

Investigation
The wreckage was moved to Anchorage for investigation. A preliminary report on the accident was published 13 April 2021; according to the preliminary report, GPS data show the helicopter hovered at a low altitude and speed (about one knot, about 1 mph), maneuvering over the ridge in the last three minutes of the flight. It crashed at about 18:35 AKDT.

According to court filings, Kellner survived the crash but “died while waiting for rescue,” while another victim is also believed to have survived initially; rescuers were informed about the overdue helicopter more than 2.5 hours after the crash.

References

External links 
 Preliminary report

Aviation accidents and incidents in the United States in 2021
Accidents and incidents involving helicopters
March 2021 events in the United States
2021 in Alaska
Aviation accidents and incidents in Alaska